Seated Young Shepherd is an oil-on-canvas painting by the French artist Hippolyte Flandrin, executed in 1834, now in the Museum of Fine Arts of Lyon, which acquired it in 2012.

History and description
The Italian model who posed for this painting is found in other Flandrin compositions, while the landscape is undoubtedly imaginary, and the painting was probably painted in the studio.

The painting presents a naked young man, with black hair, bowed head, and nonchalant attitude, seated at the foot of an imposing tree trunk. Presented as a shepherd, with a vigorous and muscular body, he holds a shepherd's staff between his legs, while his orange-colored cloak is wrapped around his left arm. In the background to the left stretches a rural landscape made up of scanty vegetation, while can be seen a flock of sheep with another shepherd lying on the ground, and a cliff, all under a pale blue sky.

References

External links

1834 paintings
Paintings by Hippolyte Flandrin
Paintings in the collection of the Museum of Fine Arts of Lyon
Nude art